Facundo Melillán (born 23 April 1997) is an Argentine professional footballer who plays as a left-back for Colegiales.

Career
All Boys gave Melillán his start in senior football. The club were relegated from Primera B Nacional in 2017–18, the defender didn't appear competitively but did make the substitutes bench on two occasions. Melillán's professional bow arrived on 24 August 2018 during a 1–2 victory against Fénix in Primera B Metropolitana, coming on for the final minutes in place of Rodrigo Díaz. He was selected to start for the first time in the succeeding September versus Defensores Unidos.

Career statistics
.

References

External links

1997 births
Living people
People from Neuquén
Argentine footballers
Association football defenders
Primera B Metropolitana players
All Boys footballers
Club Atlético Colegiales (Argentina) players